Doctor Anthony Druid, also known as Doctor Droom and Druid, is a fictional mystic and a supernatural monster-hunter appearing in American comic books published by Marvel Comics. Co-created by writer-editor Stan Lee and penciller Jack Kirby, he debuted as Dr. Anthony Droom in Amazing Adventures #1, published in March 1961 (with a cover date of June 1961). Kirby's art was inked by artist Steve Ditko. Dr. Droom appeared in four more issues of Amazing Adventures before his stories discontinued. Over a year later, artist Steve Ditko approached Stan Lee with a new magic character called Mr. Strange. Liking the idea, Stan Lee renamed the character Dr. Strange and wrote an origin story similar to Dr. Droom's. Dr. Anthony Droom was finally reintroduced to comics in 1976 in Weird Wonder Tales #19 in a retelling of his origin story which renamed him Dr. Anthony Druid. This retelling included new writing by Larry Lieber (brother of Stan Lee).

Through his knowledge, Dr. Druid has enhanced physical and mental abilities (such as hypnosis and the ability to sense magic) and knows how to counteract magic and protect against it (though rituals and special arrangement of symbols). According to the lore of Marvel Comics, this makes Dr. Druid a mystic but not a full sorcerer like Dr. Strange since he does not cast spells that alter the state of people or the environment around him and does not draw power from  Earth's magical energy, extra-dimensional energy, or energy linked to magical entities.

Considered a scholar of multiple fields, the brilliant Dr. Anthony Druid is originally a psychiatrist who then becomes an author and physician. After Dr. Druid undergoes a series of tests in Tibet, a dying lama and mystic mentally transmits to his mind secrets of how to enhance his own body and mind's power and control, as well as knowledge regarding magic and supernatural threats. Later it is said Dr. Druid also taps into the knowledge of Celtic ancestors regarding magic. With the combined knowledge of both his Celtic ancestors and the Tibetan lama, Dr. Druid acts as a magic-based consultant and hero of Earth. Over the years, he has worked with the superhero team known as the Avengers, and it is later said he was part of a group known as the Monster Hunters. On multiple occasions, he has worked with the sorcerer Dr. Strange.

Publication history
Originally introduced as Dr. Anthony Droom, the character debuted in Amazing Adventures #1 in 1961. The origin story was written by Stan Lee, penciled by Jack Kirby, and inked by Steve Ditko. In the story, Anthony Droom is referred to as a psychiatrist, scholar, and physician and is independently wealthy. After undergoing a series of tests in Tibet, he is chosen by a dying lama to protect humanity from threats. In this version of the character's origin, he is imparted with all of the lama's knowledge and then is also transformed by magic from his Caucasian appearance to now having the appearance of Asian heritage. He is told that his appearance suits his new knowledge and role. In the subsequent stories of Amazing Adventures, Droom continues to have an Asian appearance and is given a yellow skin tone.

After his origin in issue #1, Dr. Droom starred in stories in Amazing Adventures #2–4 & #6 (1961). Dr. Droom did not appear in the series again afterward, which was retitled as Amazing Adult Fantasy starting with issue #7 (the same series that with its final issue, Amazing Fantasy #15, would introduced Stan Lee and Steve Ditko's creation Spider-Man).

According to Lee, the idea of Doctor Droom was essentially succeeded by Doctor Strange: "... I always liked [Doctor Droom], but I forgot about him. It was a one-shot thing. And one day while we were trying to think of some new heroes, I thought I'd like to bring back a magician". Lee later clarified that the inciting incident to bring forth a magical character similar to Dr. Droom came when Steve Ditko brought him artwork for a character he called Mr. Strange. Stan Lee changed the name to Dr. Strange and gave the character a new version of Dr. Droom's origin, making Stephen Strange a physician who loses the use of his hands and then seeks out help from a sorcerer in the Himalayas for help, only to then become the man's student and return to New York as a sorcerer himself.

In 1976, Marvel editor Roger Stern thought to bring Doctor Droom back for issue #19 of Weird Wonder Tales, a series that reprinted previously published Marvel Comics stories, sometimes with new art. Issue #19 reprinted Dr. Droom's origin story but with some altered and added dialogue by Larry Lieber and with the protagonist now called Doctor Anthony Druid, new name conceived by Len Wein, presumably to avoid confusion with Marvel supervillain Doctor Doom. Dr. Druid sported a red outfit in his role as hero and the new version of his origin story removed the idea that the appearance of his racial heritage is altered by magic. Droom's second story was then reprinted in Weird Wonder Tales #20, again with new art work and with his name changed to Dr. Druid. The character then appeared in issues #21-22, but only as a host introducing fantasy stories to the reader. Weird Wonder Tales then ended with issue #23, which contained a reprint of another Droom story from Amazing Adventures. The story was introduced by a new splash page drawn by artist John Byrne. In the story, Droom's drab grey clothing was painted over with Druid's new red uniform.

Dr. Druid appeared next in The Incredible Hulk vol. 2 #210-211 by writer Len Wein, and Ghost Rider #26 by writer Jim Shooter. During Roger Stern's work as writer of Avengers in the 1980s, Dr. Druid frequently appeared as an associate of the team.

Dr. Druid appeared in the miniseries Druid #1–4 (May–Aug. 1995) by writer Warren Ellis and artist Leonardo Manco. In Marvel Universe #4–7 (Sept.–Dec. 1998), his backstory was expanded and retconned, now revealing he had been a member of the Monster Hunters, whose adventures took place between the "Age of Monsters" and the "Age of Heroes" (the latter era beginning when the Fantastic Four gain their powers and are soon followed by a wave of new public superheroes). Dr. Druid appeared as a Monster Hunter again in issue #2 of Marvel: The Lost Generation.

Doctor Druid was one of the feature characters in the 2011 three-issue limited series Chaos War: Dead Avengers.

Fictional character biography

Doctor Druid's real name is Dr. Anthony Ludgate Druid, although he usually refers to himself as Dr. Anthony Druid. He is an Irish psychiatrist and explorer as well as a minor telepath and magician, specializing mostly in hypnosis and other feats of mesmerism. He has minor magical abilities that have varied over the years. He is also an expert on the occult, having been trained by a Tibetan lama who had come to the U.S. for medical attention. Many years later, Druid discovered that the lama was, in fact, the Ancient One who selected Anthony Druid as a back-up in case his grooming of Doctor Strange failed.

Doctor Druid remained on the sidelines for years. He eventually appeared again and teamed with the Hulk against the Maha Yogi. With the Avengers, he encountered the Fomor and his ancestor Amergin.

Doctor Druid sometime later aided the Avengers in thwarting Baron Zemo and the fourth Masters of Evil's takeover of Avengers Mansion, making contact with the mentally damaged Blackout and helping him resist Zemo's control while also prompting him to bring Avengers Mansion back to Earth after banishing it into his Darkforce Dimension. He joined the ranks of the Avengers shortly after helping to defend from this attack. He battled a Dracula doppelganger in the realm of Death.

His membership was tainted when he was mind controlled by supervillainess the Terminatrix (at the time impersonating the space pirate Nebula) into manipulating the team on her behalf. While in this state, he even assumed chairmanship of the team for a very short period. When "Nebula" was cast into Limbo, Druid followed, as he was still under her thrall. He eventually regained control of his own mind and returned to Earth, where, after learning his true origin, he banished "Nebula" and became younger by magic.

Due to his actions while in the villain's thrall, Druid was disgraced. He was briefly reunited with his former teammates while working with Doctor Strange during the Infinity War, and later became the leader of the Secret Defenders. In that role, he was once again victimized by a villain's mind control, this time by the demon Slorioth. Doctor Druid and the demon were defeated, Druid faked his own death, and the team disbanded.

He then abandoned his spandex costume and became even more of a real, traditional druid, a fact reflected by his taking on the simple name of "Druid" and the new nature of his nature powers, but he let his feelings of rage and power lust take him over, went insane, was betrayed by his allies, and was finally killed by Hellstorm, the putative Son of Satan. Druid's ghost appeared later alongside the spirits of other dead ex-Avengers, confirming that Druid had, in fact, died this time. The Avengers later placed a memorial statue of him in the garden of Avengers Mansion.

A mere 36 hours before his death, Druid is visited by a time-traveling Black Widow. He happily assisted her with magical research pertaining to her mission, no wiser about his imminent demise.

Doctor Druid's son is introduced as one of Nick Fury's new recruits to fight against the Secret Invasion. Secret Invasion #4 reveals that he is operating under the name of Druid.

During the Chaos War storyline, Doctor Druid is among the dead heroes brought back to life when Amatsu-Mikaboshi dominated the death realms.

As part of the All-New, All-Different Marvel, Doctor Druid resurfaced on Weirdworld. Nighthawk of Earth-31916, Blur of Earth-148611 and Tyndall were captured by Doctor Druid's minions and taken to his castle. He revealed to his captives that his soul took on a corporeal form when it found Weirdworld, where he remained so that he can still be alive. Doctor Druid also revealed that Ogeode built him a massive crystal on top of his castle to amplify his mind-control abilities, which brought anyone in his part of Weirdworld under his thrall. For some reason, Thundra and Tyndall were immune to his effects due to something related to time-travel.

He later resurfaces on Earth and attempts to live a normal life, but does help Dr. Strange with a magical investigation.

Powers and abilities
Doctor Druid's latent mystical abilities were activated by the Ancient One. He has a variety of psionic abilities including telepathy which enables him to scan or project his thoughts to any mind on Earth, the ability to mesmerize minds less adept than his own, and the ability to perform mass hypnosis. Doctor Druid's hypnotic abilities enable him to achieve numerous illusory effects, including invisibility, altering the appearance of himself and others, and the projection of illusionary objects or beings. He has psychokinetic powers enabling him to levitate himself or other people and objects. Doctor Druid has limited precognitive abilities and can sense the presence of recent uses of magic and trace them to their sources.

Doctor Druid's druidic powers have a special vulnerability to iron, as did the powers of his ancestors. Iron tends to act as a lightning rod for the magical forces he employs, sometimes disrupting their effects.

Doctor Druid employs the mystical knowledge and skills of the ancient druids. Through magic rituals that may involve chants, runes, candles, potions, mystic symbols, and other such preparations, Doctor Druid can achieve various magical feats. These rituals tap the inherent mystical energies in natural objects and materials. Doctor Druid possesses various Celtic mystical artifacts as well. At one time, Druid even had access to the Moebius Stone, which was a mystic item created by Agamotto that had a limited ability to manipulate time. The stone was able to raise the dead, absorb the life-force of another, and accelerate or reverse the passage of time within a confined area, though sometimes random time-related side effects occurred. Doctor Druid eventually destroyed the artifact because he felt it was too powerful to fall into the wrong hands. Doctor Druid can also call upon the Celtic war goddesses Morrigan, Macha, and Badb for mystical assistance. Doctor Druid also possesses various yogic abilities, including control over involuntary functions of his body such as his heartbeat, respiration, bleeding, and reaction to pain.

In his latest and final incarnation, when he was called only "Druid", he has been seen manipulating fire, and making a tree instantaneously grow in a person's stomach from the seeds of an eaten apple. These powers were nature-based (elements, plants, etc.) as the druids of old worshipped nature.

Druid has earned an M.D. from Harvard, completed a residency in psychiatry, and has extensive knowledge of occult lore, especially Celtic lore.

Original Doctor Droom appearances

Amazing Adventures

All reprinted in Amazing Fantasy Omnibus (2007). The previous reprints below were edited to reflect name-change to "Doctor Druid" plus other retcons:
 #1 (June 1961)—"I Am the Fantastic Dr. Droom"
Reprinted in Weird Wonder Tales #19 (Dec. 1976)
 #2 (July 1961)—"The World Below"
Reprinted in Weird Wonder Tales #22 (May 1977)
 #3 (Aug. 1961)—"Dr. Droom Meets Zemu"
Reprinted in Weird Wonder Tales #20 (Jan. 1977)
 #4 (Sept. 1961)—"What Lurks Within?"
Never reprinted outside Amazing Fantasy Omnibus
 #6 (Nov. 1961)—"Dr. Droom Defies the Menace Called...Krogg"
Reprinted in Giant-Size Man-Thing #3 (Feb. 1975)

Other versions

Guardians of the Galaxy
In an alternate future, detailed in the Killraven series, Martians had come to Earth and wiped out much of humanity. Doctor Druid is one of the few survivors of the North American battles and leads a resistance movement based in Ireland. He also works to make sure the Martian battle is recorded in the Book of Kells.

Marvel Apes
An alternate universe version of Doctor Druid appears in the 2008 miniseries Marvel Apes #2–4 (Nov.–Dec. 2008). Druid plays a key role in issue #3 (Dec. 2008) in which he uses his staff, the Monkey's Paw, to control the realm created by Doctor Strange.

Marvel Zombies
An alternate universe version of Doctor Druid appears in the 2007 miniseries Marvel Zombies vs. The Army of Darkness. Infected with the zombie virus, he visits Doctor Strange seeking help to stop from turning. With Strange having left to join the resistance, a ravenous Druid reluctantly consumes Strange's assistant, Wong. Despite pleading for mercy and understanding from Ash Williams, Dazzler, and the Scarlet Witch, Ash surprises Druid and blows his head off with his shotgun.

Secret Wars (2015)
During the Secret Wars storyline, a variation of Doctor Druid appears in the Battleworld domain of Technopolis. He acts as a forensics scientist at the city morgue and helps Grand Marshall Rhodes investigate the murder of Spyder-Man (the superhero alias of Ben Urich's nephew Peter Urich).

Reception

Newsarama ranked Doctor Druid as the fourth worst Avengers member describing him as "most notably responsible for becoming the leader of the Avengers only to betray them after being mocked by Daimon Hellstrom, presumably for looking like Rip Torn in a cloak". The Slings and Arrows Comic Guide found him to be "always a third-stringer", and when he received his own miniseries, it was found to be a "total yawner".

References

External links
 Doctor Druid at Marvel.com
 The Grand Comics Database
 
 Doctor Droom at Don Markstein's Toonopedia. Archived from the original on April 14, 20162.

Avengers (comics) characters
Characters created by Jack Kirby
Characters created by Stan Lee
Comics characters introduced in 1961
Fictional druids
Fictional Harvard University people
Fictional physicians
Fictional psychiatrists
Irish superheroes
Marvel Comics characters who have mental powers
Marvel Comics characters who use magic
Marvel Comics telekinetics
Marvel Comics telepaths
Mythology in Marvel Comics